Cana Chapetón is a town in the Monte Cristi province of the Dominican Republic.

Sources 
World Gazeteer: Dominican Republic – World-Gazetteer.com

Populated places in Monte Cristi Province